Aki Tapani Karvonen (born 31 August 1957 in Valtimo) is a Finnish former cross-country skier who competed during the 1980s. He won three medals at the 1984 Winter Olympics in Sarajevo, with a silver in the 15 km, and two bronze medals in 50 km and the 4 × 10 km relay, respectively.

Karvonen also won three medals at the FIS Nordic World Ski Championships, with two silver medals (30 km: 1987, 4 × 10 km relay: 1989) and one bronze (4 × 10 km relay: 1982, tied with East Germany).

Doping 
Karvonen admitted in May 1985 that he'd had a blood transfusion before the 1985 World Championships. In 1994 Karvonen admitted that he'd have blood transfusions also for the 1984 Winter Olympics.

Cross-country skiing results
All results are sourced from the International Ski Federation (FIS).

Olympic Games
 3 medals – (1 silver, 2 bronze)

World Championships
 3 medals – (2 silver, 1 bronze)

World Cup

Season standings

Individual podiums

3 podiums

Team podiums

 5 podiums

Note:   Until the 1999 World Championships and the 1994 Olympics, World Championship and Olympic races were included in the World Cup scoring system.

References

External links
 
 

1957 births
Living people
People from Valtimo
Finnish sportspeople in doping cases
Doping cases in cross-country skiing
Finnish male cross-country skiers
Olympic silver medalists for Finland
Olympic bronze medalists for Finland
Cross-country skiers at the 1984 Winter Olympics
Cross-country skiers at the 1988 Winter Olympics
Olympic medalists in cross-country skiing
FIS Nordic World Ski Championships medalists in cross-country skiing
Medalists at the 1984 Winter Olympics
Olympic cross-country skiers of Finland
Sportspeople from North Karelia